Monika Müller (born 11 May 1971) is a former synchronized swimmer from Germany.

References 

1971 births
Living people
German synchronized swimmers
Olympic synchronized swimmers of Germany
Synchronized swimmers at the 1992 Summer Olympics
People from Reichenbach im Vogtland
Sportspeople from Saxony